Jana "Janka" Gereková (born 27 November 1984 in Liptovský Mikuláš) is a former Slovak biathlete.

Career
Gereková competed in the 2006 and 2010 Winter Olympics for Slovakia. Her best performance was 13th as part of the 2010 Slovak relay team. Her best individual finish was 40th, in both the 2010 sprint and pursuit. She also finished 59th in the 2006 individual and 47th in the 2010 individual.

As of February 2013, her best performance at the Biathlon World Championships is 7th, as part of the 2011 Slovak women's relay team and the 2012 and 2013 mixed relay teams. Her best individual performance is 8th, in the 2011 pursuit.

As of February 2013, Gereková has finished on the podium once in the Biathlon World Cup, winning a bronze as part of the Slovak mixed relay team in Kontiolahti during the 2011/12 season. Her best individual performance is 6th, achieved twice in sprint races during the 2012/13 season. Her best overall finish in the Biathlon World Cup is 28th, in 2011/12.

World Cup Podiums

References

External links 

 
 
 
 

1984 births
Biathletes at the 2006 Winter Olympics
Biathletes at the 2010 Winter Olympics
Biathletes at the 2014 Winter Olympics
Slovak female biathletes
Living people
Olympic biathletes of Slovakia
Sportspeople from Liptovský Mikuláš